Ocean City 34th Street Station was located in Ocean City, Cape May County, New Jersey, United States. The station — a small wooden shelter with bench seating for a few passengers, located just south of 34th Street next to a rail line running down the middle of Haven Avenue — was built in 1885 by the Ocean City Railroad, which was acquired by the Atlantic City Railroad in 1901, and later by the Pennsylvania-Reading Seashore Lines. Trains last served the station in August 1981, when service was cancelled due to poor track conditions and limited funding from the New Jersey Department of Transportation.

The station was added to the National Register of Historic Places on June 22, 1984. It was subsequently damaged beyond repair when a truck backed into it, and thus demolished.

See also
Operating Passenger Railroad Stations Thematic Resource (New Jersey)
National Register of Historic Places listings in Cape May County, New Jersey
Ocean City Tenth Street Station

References

Ocean City, New Jersey
Queen Anne architecture in New Jersey
Railway stations in the United States opened in 1885
Railway stations in Cape May County, New Jersey
Railway stations on the National Register of Historic Places in New Jersey
Former railway stations in New Jersey
Former Pennsylvania-Reading Seashore Lines stations
National Register of Historic Places in Cape May County, New Jersey
New Jersey Register of Historic Places
Demolished railway stations in the United States
Railway stations closed in 1981